Panio Gianopoulos (born July 7, 1975) is an American writer and editor.

Biography

Career
Panio Gianopoulos is the author of How to Get Into Our House and Where We Keep the Money, a short story collection about men and women struggling to find and keep love, received a starred review from Kirkus Reviews. Kirkus praised the stories for their humor and insights, calling the book "witty, discerning, and laugh-out-loud funny.”

His stories, essays, and poetry have appeared in various magazines and newspapers, including Tin House, Salon, Northwest Review, The Rattling Wall, Chicago Quarterly Review, Big Fiction, The Brooklyn Rail, Catamaran Literary Reader, and The Los Angeles Review of Books. A recipient of a New York Foundation for the Arts Award for Non-Fiction, Gianopoulos has been included in the anthologies The Bastard on the Couch, Cooking and Stealing: The Tin House Non-Fiction Reader, and "The Encyclopedia of Exes". A former book editor, he has worked at Crown Publishing, Talk Miramax Books, Bloomsbury Publishing, and Backlit Fiction,.

Personal life
He has been married to the actress Molly Ringwald since 2007. They have three children, daughter Mathilda Ereni (born October 22, 2003), and twins, Adele Georgiana and Roman Stylianos (born July 10, 2009).

Bibliography
 A Familiar Beast, Nouvella (2012)
 How to Get Into Our House and Where We Keep the Money, Four Way Books (2017)

References

External links

Gianopoulos interview 2012 (Huffington Post)

1975 births
Living people
American editors
American essayists
American short story writers
American writers of Greek descent
Place of birth missing (living people)
Writers from New York City
Stanford Graduate School of Business alumni
University of Massachusetts Amherst alumni